Lipetsk Air Base (also given as Lipetskiy, Lipetsky, Lipetsk-2, Shakhm 10, and Lipetsk West) is an air base in Lipetsk Oblast, Russia located 12 km northwest of Lipetsk. It is the combat training center of Russian Air Force, analogous to the United States Air Force's Nellis Air Force Base.  The base is made up of two medium-sized airfields joined together.

The site is home to the 4th State Centre for Aicrew Training and Field Tests (4th GTsPAPVI) and 968th IISAP.

The base is home to the 968th Instructor-Research Aviation Regiment and the 237th Air Force Display Centre of the Russian Air Force. I. N. Kozheduba - Russian Falcons both part of the 4th Centre for Combat Application and Crew Training.

History

In 1925, the Soviet government allowed Germany to open an air combat school at Lipetsk: Lipetsk fighter-pilot school. That permitted Germany to evade treaty restrictions on the development of military aviation, while the Soviet Air Forces received technical advice and access to test results.  By 1933, the Soviets concluded that the arrangement was not worthwhile, and the new German government agreed (for different reasons).  The school was closed.

The 4th Center of Combat Application and Conversion of Frontline Aviation, Russia's Top Gun school since around the 1960s, is the most well known unit on the base.  Its chief, Col. Kharchevski, became famous after air combat exercises in the US and has become the personal pilot of President Putin.
 
From the 1960s to 1990, units stationed at Lipetsk include: 
 4th Centre for Combat Employment and Retraining of Personnel (4 TsBP i PLS)
 760th Composite Training and Research Aviation Regiment (760 IISAP) flying 14 Mikoyan MiG-29E, 13 Sukhoi Su-17, 16 Sukhoi Su-25, and a number of Sukhoi Su-24, Sukhoi Su-27, and Mi-8 aircraft  as of the early 1990s.
 91st Training and Research Regiment (91 IIAP) flying Mikoyan-Gurevich MiG-23, 23 Mikoyan MiG-29, and 15 Sukhoi Su-27 aircraft as of the early 1990s 

In 1992, the 968th Fighter Aviation Regiment arrived from Falkenberg in East Germany. It was flying Mikoyan-Gurevich MiG-23 and Mikoyan MiG-29 aircraft in the mid-1990s. In 1992-1993 it became first a Research-Instructor Fighter Aviation Regiment and then a Research-Instructor Mixed Aviation Regiment. Flying solely MiG-29s by 2004, it later also flew Sukhoi Su-24M aircraft.

Gallery

References 

Soviet Air Force bases
Soviet Frontal Aviation
Soviet Air Defence Force bases
Russian Air Force bases
Buildings and structures in Lipetsk Oblast
Airports in Lipetsk Oblast